Union Sprtive de Témara is a Moroccan football club currently playing in the second division.

References

Football clubs in Morocco
1969 establishments in Morocco
Sports clubs in Morocco